The Palmer BB Machine Gun is a training weapon capable of firing ball bearings.

During World War II, the USAAF and US Navy used thousands of Palmer BB machine guns to hone the skills  of aerial gunnery. This much larger gun is cycled by an electric solenoid and powered by compressed air. The air pressure is higher, at 180-200 psi, but the velocity runs between 500 and 600 f.p.s.

References

Air guns of the United States